"Crazy Story, Pt. 3" is a song by American rapper King Von, released on September 13, 2019, as a single etracted from Von's mixtape Grandson, Vol. 1.
It is the continuation of the first two chapters Crazy Story and Crazy Story (Remix)(ft Lil Durk), which represents the second part.
The song was produced by Chopsquad DJ.

Composition 
The song is characterized by a rapped style in a very vivid and richly detailed storytelling and as for the first two chapters, it is centered around a realistic story based on lived experiences of Bennett, and where he is the protagonist. He talks about an attempted robbery that is revealed as a set up against Von himself favored by a girl, thus leading to Von being shot. In response, Von seeks revenge by ambushing and killing the girl and shooting at the same man who shot him.

Music video 
The music video was released on January 30, 2020. It frames King Von who retraces the story describing the facts to a friend of his, therefore with interspersed scenes in both first and third person.

Certifications

References 

2020 singles
2020 songs
Empire Distribution singles
King Von songs